San Andrés Larráinzar is a town in the Mexican state of Chiapas. It serves as the municipal seat for the surrounding municipality of Larráinzar.

As of 2010, the town of San Andrés Larráinzar had a population of 2,364.

The San Andrés Accords, between the federal government and the Zapatista Army of National Liberation (EZLN), were signed in the town on 16 February 1996.

References

https://web.archive.org/web/20080621074354/http://www.larrainzar.chiapas.gob.mx/

Populated places in Chiapas